Bay Parkway is a 2.7-mile (7.82 km) boulevard/parkway in the west portion of the New York City borough of Brooklyn.

Route description
Bay Parkway begins at Ocean Parkway and continues for approximately  southwesterly to Bath Beach, past Seth Low Playground and Bealin Square toward Bensonhurst Park, Shore Parkway (Exit 5), and Ceasar's Bay shopping plaza on Gravesend Bay. It runs through Bensonhurst and is four lanes wide throughout its route. Along Bay Parkway are many Chinese, Russian and Italian-American businesses as well as many residential buildings and co-ops.

History
Bay Parkway was known as 22nd Avenue until the 1930s, when the name was changed to facilitate large-scale apartment-type residential development. Its renaming as a parkway was first proposed in the state legislature in 1892, along with Bay Ridge Parkway, and Fort Hamilton Parkway, placing the road under the jurisdiction of the Brooklyn Parks Department. The renaming was intended to boost the desirability of real estate along its route.

Transit
Bay Parkway has three New York City Subway stops:
Bay Parkway on the BMT Sea Beach Line
Bay Parkway on the IND Culver Line
Bay Parkway on the BMT West End Line

Bay Parkway is also served by the B6 and B82 and B82+ Select Bus Service bus routes. The B6 serves Bay Parkway south of Avenue J and the B82 serves its south of Kings Highway.

References

Streets in Brooklyn
Parkways in New York City